Idris Cox (15 July 1899 – 25 June 1989) was a Welsh communist activist and newspaper editor.

Born in Maesteg, Cox grew up in Cwmfelin, where he worked in a coal mine from a young age.  His family was highly religious, and he attended chapel three times each Sunday, but he lost interest in religion after becoming active in the trade union movement, and was involved in the South Wales miners' strike of 1915.  He was elected to the Management Committee of the Garth Miners' Institute at the age of 18 and, in 1920, he became the lodge's delegate to coalfield conferences. Becoming interested in Marxism, he served as Chairman of the local miners' lodge during the 1921 lockout.

In 1923, the South Wales Miners' Federation granted Cox a scholarship, enabling him to study at the Central Labour College in London and, after the 1924 general election, he joined the Communist Party of Great Britain (CPGB). He returned to Wales in 1925, but was unable to find work, other than a short spell as a deputy checkweighman. Instead, he founded a National Unemployed Workers' Movement branch in Maesteg, and continued his communist activity there.

By 1926, Cox was an Area Organiser for the CPGB in Mid Glamorgan. However, he was also active in the Labour Party, and became vice-chairman of its Maesteg branch in 1927. He continued his rise in the CPGB, becoming District Secretary that year, and was co-opted to its National Executive in 1928, attending the Sixth Congress of the Communist International that year.

Cox returned to London in 1929 to join the CPGB's political bureau. He also worked as a correspondent for the Workers' Weekly, and soon became National Organiser of the party. He married Dora Roberts (1904–2000) in 1931.

In 1935, Cox became editor of the replacement party newspaper, the Daily Worker.  Shortly after, he returned to Wales, as Secretary of the Welsh District of the CPGB. He served in this role until 1951, and stood unsuccessfully for the party in Rhondda East at the 1951 general election.  Later that year, Cox became Secretary of the International Department of the CPGB, and was heavily involved in the Movement for Colonial Freedom. He retired in 1970, and wrote his autobiography, Story of a Welsh Rebel.

References

1899 births
1989 deaths
Communist Party of Great Britain members
People from Maesteg
Welsh communists
Welsh miners
Welsh newspaper editors